"Pressure" is a song by Trinidadian-British singer Billy Ocean, which was released in 1993 as the lead single from his eighth studio album, Time to Move On. The song was written by Ocean, Wycliffe Johnson and Clevie Browne, and produced by Steely & Clevie. "Pressure" reached No. 55 on the UK Singles Chart and remained in the Top 100 for two weeks. It remains Ocean's last appearance on the chart.

"Pressure" was inspired by Ocean's wrongful arrest in October 1991 in London on the suspicion of drug dealing. The charges against the singer were subsequently dropped.

Critical reception
Upon its release, Penny Kiley of the Liverpool Echo wrote, "He's kept up with new music - this is a solid dance track with some familiar samples. And the words sound heartfelt." A reviewer from Music & Media described the song as a "slightly disguised Italo dance tune". In a review of Time to Move On, Deborah Wilker of the Sun-Sentinel considered the song "buoyant" and one that "should score with the club crowd".

Track listing

 7" single
"Pressure" (U.S. Radio Edit) - 4:04
"On Your Knees" - 5:00

 12" single
"Pressure" (Stevo's Extended Club Mix) - 6:00
"Pressure" (U.S. Radio Edit) - 4:04
"Pressure" (U.K. 12" Extended Mix) - 6:23
"Pressure" (U.K. Dub Mix 1) - 5:08

 12" single (European promo)
"Pressure" (Extended Club Mix) - 6:25
"Pressure" (Sparse Mix) - 5:16
"Pressure" (Dub Mix) - 5:20

 CD single (UK release)
"Pressure" (U.S. Radio Edit) - 4:04
"Pressure" (Stevo's Extended Club Mix) - 6:00
"Pressure" (U.K. 12" Extended Mix) - 6:23
"On Your Knees" - 5:00

 CD single (European release)
"Pressure" (U.S. Radio Edit) - 4:04
"Pressure" (Mr Lee's Radio Dance Mix) - 4:15
"Pressure" (U.K. 12" Extended Mix) - 6:23
"On Your Knees" - 5:00

Personnel
Pressure
 Billy Ocean - vocals
 Dalton Browne, Danny Browne - guitar
 Wycliffe Johnson - keyboards
 Clevie Browne - drums, percussion

Production
 Steely & Clevie - producers
 Colin York - recording engineer on "Pressure" and "On Your Knees"
 Chris Trevett - mixing engineer on "Pressure" and "On Your Knees", recording engineer on "On Your Knees", remix engineer on "Stevo's Extended Club Mix"
 Anthony Saunders - recording engineer on "On Your Knees"
 Mr. Lee - remix and additional production on "Stevo's Extended Club Mix" and "Mr Lee's Radio Dance Mix"
 Stephen George - remix engineer on "Stevo's Extended Club Mix"
 Tommy D. - remix and additional production on "Extended Mix" and "Dub Mix"
 Gary Wilkinson - remix engineer
 Tom Coyne - mastering

Charts

References

1993 songs
1993 singles
Billy Ocean songs
Jive Records singles